

Cabinet

Sources

Government of South Africa
Executive branch of the government of South Africa
Cabinets of South Africa
1921 establishments in South Africa
1924 disestablishments in South Africa
Cabinets established in 1921
Cabinets disestablished in 1924
Jan Smuts

nl:Kabinetten-Smuts